Johanan or John Gaddi (Caddis in the King James Version, Gaddis in the Douai-Rheims Version, Hebrew: יוחנן הגדי) was the oldest of the sons of Mattathias, and brother of Judas Maccabeus. He was one of the leaders of the revolt of the Maccabees in the 2nd century BC.

First historical reference 
He was first mentioned along with his father and brothers, in this way:

Possible reference in 2 Maccabees
The next reference is in the Jewish historical work 2 Maccabees. It is as follows:

Just after this battle, as the Talmud, Josephus, 1 Maccabees 4:36-59, and 2 Maccabees 10:1-8 relate, the brothers recaptured and rededicated the Temple of Jerusalem, starting the Festival of Dedication (or as it is more commonly known, Hanukkah.)

Death
The final references to John Gaddi are the events surrounding his death. This is the account found in 1 Maccabees:

See also 
 The Books of Maccabees

References 

People in the deuterocanonical books
Maccabees
2nd-century BCE Jews